Pierre Daldoumbe Lama (born 18 October 1979) is a former Chadian professional football player. He made seven appearances for the Chad national football team.

See also
 List of Chad international footballers

References

External links
 

1979 births
Living people
Chadian footballers
Chad international footballers
Place of birth missing (living people)
Association football defenders